State Trunk Highway 127 (often called Highway 127, STH-127 or WIS 127) is a  state highway in the U.S. state of Wisconsin. It runs from WIS 16 near Wisconsin Dells east to Interstate 39 (I-39) and WIS 16 in Portage; the highway is located entirely within Columbia County. WIS 127 is maintained by the Wisconsin Department of Transportation (WisDOT).

Route description
WIS 127 begins at a junction with WIS 16 and County Trunk Highway WD (CTH-WD) in the Town of Newport, southwest of Wisconsin Dells. From here, the highway heads east through farmland, crossing CTH-O. It enters the Town of Lewiston, passing to the south of Lake Corning. Past the lake, the route meets CTH-XX and CTH-AA in succession before turning southeast; the latter route connects WIS 127 to Briggsville. WIS 127 crosses a creek before turning east to pass Lewiston Elementary School. After crossing a second creek, the route again heads southeast toward Portage. The highway curves south to pass Columbia Correctional Institution, a maximum-security state prison, before entering Portage. In Portage, WIS 127 passes several businesses before terminating at a junction with WIS 16 and exit 89B on I-39.

History
WIS 127 is located on a former alignment of US 16 (now WIS 16). It was removed from US 16 when the portion of the route from Wisconsin Dells to Portage was realigned on a more direct routing in 1948, bringing it closer to the Wisconsin River. The route then became portions of CTH-WD and CTH-AA before re-entering the Wisconsin State Trunk Highway System in 1956, when WIS 127 was established.

Major intersections

See also

References

127
Transportation in Columbia County, Wisconsin